Thomas Blayney (1785 -?) was a Welsh harpist. He was born in Llanllwchaiarn, Montgomeryshire. His brother, Arthur Blayney was a well-known violinist. Thomas was appointed family harpist to the household of Lord Powis in 1829, but died shortly after his appointment to the position, although the exact year of his death is not known.

References 

18th-century Welsh people
Welsh harpists
People from Montgomeryshire
18th-century Welsh musicians